Six ships of the Royal Navy have been named HMS Inconstant, whilst another was planned:

  was a 36-gun fifth rate, previously the French ship . She was captured in 1778 and renamed HMS Convert in 1783. She was broken up in 1791.
  was a 36-gun fifth rate launched in 1783 and broken up in 1817.
HMS Inconstant was to have been a 46-gun fifth rate. She was ordered in 1825, but was cancelled in 1832.
  was a 36-gun fifth rate launched in 1836 and sold in 1862.
  was an iron-hulled screw frigate launched in 1868.
  was an  light cruiser launched in 1914 and sold in 1922.
  was a destroyer ordered by Turkey in 1939 but requisitioned while building for the Royal Navy; she was nominally classed with the  destroyers, launched in 1941 and returned to Turkey in 1946. The Turks sold her in 1960.

Royal Navy ship names